International College, Beirut, Lebanon, is an independent non-profit international school. Its students come from all over Lebanon, as well as the Middle-East and around the world. With two campuses, one in the Lebanese capital Beirut and the other in the urban hillsides (Ain Aar), the school educates over 3,500 students each year. The school was established in 1891 and is chartered in Massachusetts, US.

History
The International College was founded in Smyrna (now İzmir), Turkey in 1891, by Alexander MacLachlan, a Canadian educator, as the American Boys’ School. The first class of five students graduated in 1895, and it was renamed the American Collegiate Institute for Boys.

In 1913, IC opened an elementary school, and added the French language Section Secondaire in 1926.

In 1936, Dr. Bayard Dodge of the American University of Beirut invited IC to come to Beirut and affiliate with AUB as its preparatory school. As a result, IC was known for many years as "The Prep."  During its first year in Beirut, IC had 901 students from 37 countries representing 16 religious sects. IC had students from all over the Middle East, who came as boarders living in Thomson and Sage Halls.

IC separated from AUB in the 1960s, naming a separate board of trustees and admitted women to become a co-educational institution.

During the Lebanese Civil War under the leadership of Dr. Alton Reynolds, students and teachers of all religious sects continued to attend classes in Ras Beirut. It evolved to become a leading institution of education in the Middle East with the inspiration of some exemplary Directors such as Mr. Sadik Umar and Mr. Elie Kurban.

In 1988, a satellite campus was constructed in Ain A’ar, far from Beirut,  to accommodate the children of alumni in that area. The Ain A’ar campus continues to serve students from pre-school through middle school.

In 1997, IC achieved dual accreditation by the Council of International Schools and the New England Association of Schools and Colleges.

Schools
All content is taught using the target languages of Arabic, English and French and works within the PYP curricular framework.

The Elementary School covers grades one through five (ages six to eleven). The medium of instruction is either English or French, although Arabic is mandatory for all students. An Arabic program is made available in IC to students who have lived abroad and qualify for exemption from the regular programs.

The Middle School is a four-year cycle covering grades 6 through 9.  It offers three programs: the Lebanese Program prepares students for the official Lebanese Brevet examination; the College Preparatory Program is an English medium non-Brevet program; and the French Program is non-Brevet program taught in French that prepares the student for the official French Baccalaureate examination.  All programs require the teaching of Arabic, English, French, Mathematics, Science, Social Studies, Physical Education, Arts, Information Technology (IT), Music and Theatre Courses. Grades 6,7, and 8 also receive Technology instruction.  1

The Secondary School is a three-year cycle made up of four separate programs: The Lebanese Baccalaureate Program which follows a curriculum set by the Lebanese Ministry of Education; The French Baccalaureate Program which follows a curriculum set by the French Ministry of Education; the International Baccalaureate (IB) Diploma Program; and The American College Preparatory Program (CPP), a non-baccalaureate diploma program.

IC's Ain Aar campus holds two schools. The Lower School for students from nursery to Grade 3 and the Upper School for students from Grade 4 to Grade 9 inclusive. Both Ain Aar schools follow the same curriculum as applied in the Ras Beirut campus.

Secondary School programs 
The Lebanese Baccalaureate Program, which follows a curriculum set by the Lebanese Ministry of Education, is available to all students in either an English or French track for core subjects including math and sciences. In the French track, English is taught as a third language and vice versa. In both tracks, Social Studies, History, Geography, Civics, Sociology and Economics, are taught in Arabic with the study of Arabic literature and language mandatory.  In the second year, students chose a focus in humanities or sciences, and specialize in the third year.

The French Baccalaureate Program, which follows a curriculum set by the French Ministry of Education, is designed to meet the needs of foreign and Lebanese students who wish to pursue the French Baccalaureate.  All core subjects are taught in French. Upon successful completion of the Lebanese or French Baccalaureate program, students are eligible to enter at the sophomore level in all Lebanese and many European and North American universities. Some students pursue both the Lebanese and French Baccalaureate simultaneously.
See Secondary education in France.

The International Baccalaureate Program is a two-year curriculum with an assessment component.  The IB diploma is recognized by universities around the world. Students admitted to the IB program must hold a second nationality in addition to Lebanese, or must obtain an exemption from the Lebanese official program allowing them to engage in a non-Lebanese program.  A good knowledge of English is a prerequisite as it is the language of instruction and also a school average of around a 79.

The "College Preparatory Program" is a two-year curriculum designed on the American High school System. Students admitted into this program must hold a foreign passport. Courses taken are extensive and rigorous. Calculus, micro and macroeconomics, and worldwide literature are some of the things taught in courses such as Math, Biology, Economics, Global Issues, English, Arabic, French, Art, Music, Physical Education, and History.

Community Service Program 

Participation in the Community Service Program is mandatory for all IC Secondary School students.  Students select two community projects per year, ranging from helping to raise awareness of environmental issues, volunteer at orphanages, and centers for the aged, infirmed and disabled.

Notable alumni
 Constantin Zureiq, "father" of Arab nationalism
 Ghassan Tueni, former Lebanese MP, his son was the assassinated politician and journalist Gebran Tueni.
 Basil Fuleihan, assassinated Lebanese Minister of Economy
 Druze MP Walid Jumblatt
 Adil Osseiran, Lebanese independence figure and parliament speaker
 Salim Hoss, former Prime Minister of Lebanon
 Sobhi Mahmassani, legal scholar, former Lebanese member of parliament and Minister of National Economy 
 Saeb Salam, former Prime Minister of Lebanon
 Yassine Jaber, Shia Lebanese member of parliament, minister of Economy from 1996 to 1998
David Ramadan, former elected member of the Virginia House of Delegates.
Nawaf Salam, permanent Lebanese ambassador to the UN, appointed judge in the International Court of Justice in 2017.
Guy Béart, French singer and songwriter

Honors 
IC is the first green school building with LEED "Gold" certification in Lebanon and the Middle East.

See also
 Education in the Ottoman Empire

References 

With Youth on Phoenician Shores, Leslie W. Leavitt, Wellesley, Massachusetts, 1968
Seeing Arabs Through An American School, Robert F. Ober Jr., Philadelphia, 2003.

External links 
 International College website
 IC Alumni and Development website 

Educational institutions established in 1891
International schools in Beirut
International Baccalaureate schools in Lebanon
Private schools in Lebanon
1891 establishments in the Ottoman Empire